Joachim Philipkowski (born 26 February 1961 in Mrągowo, Poland) is a German football coach and a former player who manages the youth team of FC St. Pauli.

References

1961 births
Living people
People from Mrągowo
People from the Kingdom of Prussia
German footballers
Association football midfielders
Bundesliga players
2. Bundesliga players
FC St. Pauli players
1. FC Nürnberg players
German football managers
FC St. Pauli managers
German people of Polish descent